Ernest Edison West (September 2, 1931May 1, 2021) was a United States Army soldier and a recipient of the United States military's highest decoration, the Medal of Honor, for his actions during the Korean War.

Early life

West was born in Russell, Kentucky, on September 2, 1931.  He grew up in an orphanage at the Methodist Children's Home in Versailles, Kentucky.  He went on to reside in Wurtland and was employed by Chesapeake and Ohio Railway (now CSX Transportation).

Korean War
West was drafted into the United States Army in 1950. By October 12, 1952, he was serving in Korea as a private first class with Company L, 14th Infantry Regiment, 25th Infantry Division. After his unit was ambushed near Sataeri on that day, he ran through heavy fire to rescue his wounded commander, Captain George Gividen. As he was pulling the man to safety, three hostile soldiers attacked. West shielded the commander with his body and killed the attackers with his rifle, suffering a wound which resulted in the loss of his eye in the process. Despite this injury, he remained on the field and assisted in the evacuation of other wounded men, at one point killing three more hostile soldiers.

For these actions, West was awarded the Medal of Honor just over a year later, on January 29, 1954.  He was hesitant to receive the honor, believing that "if one was going to get a medal, everybody ought to have one.  We all went, we all served."  He was the second person from Greenup County to be conferred the Medal of Honor (after John W. Collier) and the first living recipient from that county.

Post-war life
Upon his return from military service, West went back to Wurtland and to his job at C&O Railway.  The company was initially reluctant to re-hire him due to his disability, but relented after a phone call with the Veterans Administration.

West died on May 1, 2021, at St. Mary's Medical Center in Huntington, West Virginia, at the age of 89. West was buried at Kentucky Veterans Cemetery Northeast in his home county.

Medal of Honor citation

West's official Medal of Honor citation reads:

See also

List of Medal of Honor recipients
List of Korean War Medal of Honor recipients

References

1931 births
2021 deaths
United States Army soldiers
United States Army personnel of the Korean War
United States Army Medal of Honor recipients
Korean War recipients of the Medal of Honor
People from Greenup County, Kentucky
People from Woodford County, Kentucky
Military personnel from Kentucky